The Agrarian Party (PA) was a right-wing political party in Italy.

History
The Agrarian Party was the main movement of the land owners and it was characterized by a pro-business vision and a conservative and reactionary tendency. Its main members were the prince Pietro Lanza di Scalea, who served as Minister of War in the first government of Luigi Facta and later as Minister of the Colonies in the government of Benito Mussolini, Francesco Saverio d'Ayala and Giovanni Lo Monte.

In 1924, many members of the Agrarian Party merged into Mussolini's National List.

References

Defunct political parties in Italy
Political parties established in 1920
Political parties disestablished in 1924
Conservative parties in Italy
1920 establishments in Italy
1924 disestablishments in Italy
Defunct agrarian political parties